List of notable events in music that took place in the year 1966.

Specific locations
1966 in British music
1966 in Norwegian music

Specific genres
1966 in country music
1966 in jazz

Events
 January 8 – Shindig! is broadcast for the last time on ABC, with musical guests the Kinks and the Who; 2 days earlier, the birthday of Elvis Presley is celebrated in the final Thursday episode of the series.
 January 14 – Young English singer David Jones changes his last name to Bowie to avoid being confused with Davy Jones of the Monkees.
 January 17 – Simon & Garfunkel release the album Sounds of Silence in the US.
 February 2 – The first edition of Go-Set magazine is published in Melbourne, Australia. Founded by former Monash University students Phillip Frazer and Tony Schauble, the new weekly is the first independent periodical in Australia devoted entirely to popular music and youth culture. The inaugural 24-page issue has a cover feature on Tom Jones, stories on The Groop, singer Pat Carroll and DJ Ken Sparkes and a feature on mod fashion by designer Prue Acton.
 February 6 – The Animals appear a fifth time on The Ed Sullivan Show to perform their iconic Vietnam-anthem hit "We Gotta Get Out of this Place".
 February 17 – Brian Wilson starts recording "Good Vibrations" with The Wrecking Crew, continuing for several months and marking a beginning to the famed Smile sessions.
 February 19 – Jefferson Airplane and Big Brother and the Holding Company with Janis Joplin perform at the Fillmore.
 February 25 – The Yardbirds release the single "Shapes of Things"/"Mister, You're a Better Man Than I", heralding the dawn of the psychedelic era in British rock. "Shapes" will peak at No. 3 in the UK and No. 10 in Canada and the US, where it remains on the charts throughout the spring of 1966, making its final Hot 100 appearance mid-June.
 March 4 – The Beatles' John Lennon is quoted in the London Evening Standard newspaper as saying that "We're more popular than Jesus now." In August, following publication of this remark in Datebook, there are Beatles protests and record burnings in the Southern US's Bible Belt.
 March 5 – The 11th Eurovision Song Contest is staged in the Villa Louvigny, Luxembourg. Udo Jürgens, having represented Austria in the last two contests (sixth in 1964; fourth in 1965), finally scores a first for the country, with "Merci, Chérie", which he co-wrote.
 March 6 – In the UK, 5,000 fans of the Beatles sign a petition urging British Prime minister Harold Wilson to reopen Liverpool's Cavern Club.
 March 14 – The Byrds release the psychedelic single "Eight Miles High" in the US. It is banned in several states due to allegations that the lyrics advocate drug use, yet reaches No.14 on the Billboard 100 charts.
 March 15 – The 8th Annual Grammy Awards are held in New York, hosted by Jerry Lewis. Roger Miller wins the most awards with five. Frank Sinatra's September of My Years wins Album of the Year, Herb Alpert & the Tijuana Brass' version of "A Taste of Honey" wins Record of the Year and Tony Bennett's version of "The Shadow of Your Smile" wins Song of the Year. Tom Jones wins Best New Artist.
 April – Herb Alpert & the Tijuana Brass set a world record by placing five albums simultaneously on Billboard's Pop Album Chart, with four of them the Top 10. Their music outsells The Beatles by a margin of two-to-one – over 13 million recordings. They win 4 Grammys this year.
 April 11 – First public performance in the Metropolitan Opera House, of Giacomo Puccini's La fanciulla del West, though the official opening of the new opera house will not take place until September 16.
 April 12 – In Los Angeles, California, Jan Berry, of Jan and Dean, crashes his Corvette into a truck that is parked on Whittier Boulevard. Berry slips into a two-month-long coma and suffers total physical paralysis for over a year as well as extensive brain damage.
 April 23 – For the first time since its January 18, 1964, issue, the Billboard Hot 100 chart fails to have an artist from the UK with a Top 10 single, ending a streak of 117 consecutive weeks.
 May 1 – The Beatles, The Rolling Stones and The Who perform at the NMEs poll winners' show at the Empire Pool (Wembley) in London. This will be The Beatles' last conventional live concert in Britain. The show is videotaped for later broadcast but The Beatles' and The Stones' segments are omitted because of union conflicts.
 May 6 – The first issue of Džuboks, the first Yugoslav magazine dedicated to rock music and the first rock magazine in a socialist country, is released.
 May 7 – The Rolling Stones release "Paint It, Black" in the US (May 13 in the UK); this becomes the first number one hit single in the US and UK to feature a sitar (played by Brian Jones).
 May 16 – Legendary album Pet Sounds by The Beach Boys is released in the US.
 May 17 – Bob Dylan and the Hawks (later The Band) perform at the Free Trade Hall, Manchester, England. Dylan is booed by the audience because of his decision to tour with an electric band, the boos culminating in the famous "Judas" shout.
 May 30 – Them, fronted by Van Morrison, begin a three-week stint as the headliner act at the Whisky a Go Go in Hollywood. On the last night June 18, they are joined on stage by that week's opening act The Doors. Van and Jim Morrison sing "Gloria" together.
 June 6 – 25-year-old Claudette Frady-Orbison, while motorcycle riding with her husband Roy Orbison, is killed when her motorcycle is struck by a pickup truck in Gallatin, Tennessee.
 June 18 – At a drunken gig at The Queen's College, Oxford in England, bassist/producer Paul Samwell-Smith quits The Yardbirds and star session guitarist Jimmy Page agrees to take over on bass.
 June 20 – Bob Dylan's album Blonde on Blonde is released in the US.
 June 27 – Frank Zappa and The Mothers of Invention's debut album, Freak Out!, is released in the US. It is an initial failure, but gains a massive cult following in subsequent years.
 July 2 – The Beatles become the first musical group to perform at the Nippon Budokan Hall in Tokyo. The performance ignites protests from local citizens who feel that it is inappropriate for a rock and roll band to play at Budokan.
 July 29 – Bob Dylan is injured in a motorcycle accident near his home in Woodstock, New York. He is not seen in public for over a year.
 July 31 – The "supergroup" Cream, a trio featuring Eric Clapton (guitar), Ginger Baker (drums) and Jack Bruce (bass guitar, lead vocals) performs its first official concert at the Windsor (UK) Jazz & Blues Festival.
 August 1 – "Midsummer Serenades: A Mozart Festival" is held – the first Mostly Mozart Festival.
 August 5 – The Beatles release their album Revolver in the UK, expanding the year's psychedelic sound.
 August 11 – John Lennon holds a press conference in Chicago, Illinois, to apologize for his remarks the previous March. "I suppose if I had said television was more popular than Jesus, I would have gotten away with it. I'm sorry I opened my mouth. I'm not anti-God, anti-Christ, or anti-religion. I was not knocking it. I was not saying we are greater or better."
 August 17 – The Moscow Radio Symphony Orchestra becomes the first major overseas orchestra to perform at The Proms.
 August 24 – American rock band The Doors record their self-titled debut album.
 August 25 – The Yardbirds' lead guitarist Jeff Beck takes ill in San Francisco and Jimmy Page, who has been playing bass, takes over on lead guitar for the band's concert at the Carousel Ballroom.
 August 29
 The Beatles perform their last official concert at Candlestick Park in San Francisco, California. The last number they play is Little Richard's "Long Tall Sally".
 NBC airs the last episode of Hullabaloo, with Elvis Presley performing "Aud Lang Slyne" (the episode previously aired in April).
 September 12 – The first episode of The Monkees television series is broadcast on NBC in the US.
 September 16
 The Metropolitan Opera House (Lincoln Center) opens in New York City with the première of Samuel Barber's opera Antony and Cleopatra. The opera is rejected by the critics.
 Eric Burdon records a solo album after leaving The Animals and appears on the show Ready, Steady, Go, singing "Help Me Girl", a UK #14 solo hit. Also on the show are Otis Redding and Chris Farlowe.
 September 23 – The Yardbirds debut their twin lead guitar lineup, featuring Jeff Beck and Jimmy Page, at the Royal Albert Hall in London, opening for The Rolling Stones 1966 UK tour. Also on the bill are Ike & Tina Turner, Peter Jay and the New Jaywalkers and Long John Baldry.
 September 24 – Jimi Hendrix arrives in London to record with producer/manager Chas Chandler.
 October 8 – WOR-FM in New York City becomes the first FM rock music station, under the leadership of DJ Murray The K.
 October 22 – With their album The Supremes A' Go-Go, The Supremes become the first all-female group to reach number one on the US Billboard 200.
 November 9 – John Lennon meets Yoko Ono when he attends a preview of her art exhibition at the Indica Gallery in London.
 November 15 – Japanese band The Tigers make their first television appearance, changing their name from "The Funnys" for the occasion.
 November 24 – The Beatles begin recording sessions for their Sgt. Pepper's Lonely Hearts Club Band album at Abbey Road Studios in London.
 November 30 – The Yardbirds officially announce that Jeff Beck has left the band, leaving Jimmy Page as sole guitarist in the group, within which Page would plant the seeds of Led Zeppelin.
 December 6 – A Smile vocal overdub session by The Beach Boys for the song "Cabin Essence" becomes the scene of a climactic argument between member Mike Love and third-party lyricist Van Dyke Parks, causing him to gradually distance away from the project.
 December 9
 The Who release their second album A Quick One with a nine-minute "mini-opera" "A Quick One While He's Away".
 The Move release their debut single "Night of Fear".
 December 16 – The Jimi Hendrix Experience release their first single in the UK, "Hey Joe".
 December 17 – David Oppenheim films Brian Wilson at his home performing his composition "Surf's Up". The footage will later be used for CBS's Inside Pop: The Rock Revolution to be aired the next April.
 December 23–30 – The UFO Club opens in London, featuring psychedelic bands Pink Floyd and Soft Machine; and the films of Andy Warhol and Kenneth Anger.
1966 dates unknown
Dalida receives, for a second time, the Music Hall Bravos.
Charley Pride is signed by RCA.
The Centre d'Etudes de Mathématique et Automatique Musicales (Centre for Automatic and Mathematical Music) is founded in Paris by Iannis Xenakis.
Modern Assyrian music takes off when Albert Rouel Tamras releases his first records in Baghdad in 1966 on the Bashirphone label.
Conductor Herbert Kegel marries soprano Celestina Casapietra.
Pungmul music is recognized as an important Intangible Cultural Property in South Korea, under the title  ("twelve movements of farmers' music").

Bands formed
 See :Category:Musical groups established in 1966

Bands disbanded
See :Category:Musical groups disestablished in 1966

Albums released

January

February

March

April

May

June

July

August

September

October

November

December

Release date unknown

 A Slice of the Top – Hank Mobley with Lee Morgan
 Adam's Apple – Wayne Shorter
 Alfie Soundtrack – Sonny Rollins
 All About Makeba – Miriam Makeba
 An Evening with Belafonte/Mouskouri – Harry Belafonte
 Are You a Boy or Are You a Girl? – The Barbarians
 The Best of Ronnie Dove – Ronnie Dove
 Bill Haley-a-Go Go – Bill Haley & His Comets
 Blow-Up Soundtrack – Herbie Hancock
 Boom – The Sonics
 Both Sides of Herman's Hermits – Herman's Hermits
 Calypso in Brass – Harry Belafonte
Canzoni napoletane moderne – Mario Trevi
 Che chiagne a ffà! – Mario Trevi
 Come the Day (UK) (Georgy Girl) (US) – The Seekers
 Come Out – Steve Reich
 Country Boy – Bobby Vinton
 Country Favorites-Willie Nelson Style – Willie Nelson
 Country Joe and the Fish – Country Joe and the Fish (EP)
 The Creation – The Creation
 DelightfuLee – Lee Morgan with Wayne Shorter
 Dion & The Belmonts Together Again – Dion DiMucci & the Belmonts
 Distant Drums – Jim Reeves
 Double Dynamite – Sam & Dave
 Down on Stovall's Plantation – Muddy Waters
 Drums Unlimited – Max Roach
 East Broadway Run Down – Sonny Rollins
 Easy Livin' – Clare Fischer
 The Empty Foxhole – Ornette Coleman
 An Evening with Belafonte/Mouskouri – Harry Belafonte and Nana Mouskouri
 Faithful Forever – Marianne Faithfull
 The Far East Suite – Duke Ellington
 The Feel of Neil Diamond – Neil Diamond
 Finnegan Wakes – The Dubliners
 Follow Me... – Crispian St. Peters
 For the Night People – Julie London
 From Nashville with Love – Chet Atkins
 From the Heart – Tom Jones
 Go Away From My World (EP) – Marianne Faithfull
 The Great Arrival – Sérgio Mendes and Brasil '66
 The Great San Bernardino Birthday Party & Other Excursions – John Fahey
 Grrr – Hugh Masekela
 Handful of Soul – James Brown
 Hanky Panky – Tommy James and the Shondells
 A Harvest of Gentle Clang – Patrick Sky
 Herb Alpert Presents Sergio Mendes & Brasil '66 – Sérgio Mendes and Brasil '66
 Here and Now and Sounding Good! – Dick Morrissey Quartet
 Hey Joe – The Leaves
 The High, Lonesome Sound of Bill Monroe – Bill Monroe
 How Does That Grab You? – Nancy Sinatra
 Ike and Tina Turner and the Raelettes – Ike & Tina Turner
 Impressions of a Patch of Blue – Sun Ra
 In My Quiet Room – Harry Belafonte
 In the Beginning – Paul Revere & the Raiders
 In The Christmas Spirit – Booker T. & the M.G.'s
 It's Uptown – The George Benson Quartet
 Jack Jones Sings – Jack Jones
 James Brown Plays New Breed (The Boo-Ga-Loo) – James Brown
 James Brown Sings James Brown Today and Yesterday – James Brown
 Just Between the Two of Us – Merle Haggard
 La Dolce Italy – Sergio Franchi
 Lightly Latin – Perry Como
 Little Wheel Spin and Spin – Buffy Sainte-Marie
 Live at the Cafe Au Go Go – Blues Project
 Live in Greenwich Village – Albert Ayler
 The Lost Acetates 1965–1966 – The Misunderstood
 Love, Strings and Jobim – Antonio Carlos Jobim
 Machines (EP) – Manfred Mann
 Magic Box – The Loved Ones
 Malaisha – Miriam Makeba
 Mama Too Tight – Archie Shepp
 Mann Made Hits – Manfred Mann
 Mighty Instrumentals – James Brown
 The Missing Links – The Missing Links
 Mission: Impossible – Lalo Schifrin
 Mode for Joe – Joe Henderson
 Monorails and Satellites – Sun Ra
 Music of the Middle East – John Berberian
 North Country Maid – Marianne Faithfull
 Nothing Is – Sun Ra
 Once Upon a Time – Earl Hines
 The Originator – Bo Diddley
 Other Planes of There – Sun Ra
 Perry Como in Italy – Perry Como
 The Peter, Paul and Mary Album – Peter, Paul & Mary
 Play One More – Ian & Sylvia
 Projections – Blues Project
 Psychedelic Lollipops – Blues Magoos
 Ray's Moods – Ray Charles
 Red Rubber Ball – The Cyrkle
 The Real Folk Blues – Howlin' Wolf, John Lee Hooker and Memphis Slim
 Reflections in a Crystal Wind – Richard Fariña and Mimi Fariña
 The Remains – The Remains
 Ridin' High – The Impressions
 Road Runner – Junior Walker & the All Stars
 Ronnie Dove Sings the Hits for You – Ronnie Dove
 Sam and Dave Roulette – Sam & Dave
 Satisfied With You – The Dave Clark Five
 The Shadow of Your Smile – Andy Williams
 Shadows Music – The Shadows
 Sometimes Good Guys Don't Wear White – The Standells
 Sophisticated Beggar – Roy Harper (Debut)
 Soul Sister – Aretha Franklin
 Sound – Roscoe Mitchell Sextet
 Speak No Evil – Wayne Shorter
 Stop! Stop! Stop! – The Hollies
 Swinging Doors – Merle Haggard
 Symphony for Improvisers – Don Cherry with Pharoah Sanders and Gato Barbieri
 Take a Little Walk With Me – Tom Rush
 Tauhid – Pharoah Sanders
 They're Coming to Take Me Away, Ha-Haaa! – Napoleon XIV
 Tiny Bubbles – Don Ho
 Today! – Skip James
 Try Too Hard – The Dave Clark Five
 Unit Structures – Cecil Taylor
 Unity – Larry Young
 Víctor Jara (Geografía) – Víctor Jara
 Visits Planet Earth – Sun Ra
 Volume One – The West Coast Pop Art Experimental Band
 When Angels Speak of Love – Sun Ra
 Where Is Brooklyn? – Don Cherry with Pharoah Sanders
 Where Were You When I Needed You? – The Grass Roots
 Whiskey-a-Go Go – Bill Haley & His Comets
 Why Pick on Me? – The Standells
 Wild Is the Wind – Nina Simone
 You Got My Mind Messed Up – James Carr
 You Make Me Feel So Good – The McCoys

Top popular records of 1966

The 1966 year-end list is composed of records that appeared in Billboard HOT 100 charts starting November 1965 and before December 1966. Each week fifteen points were awarded to the number one record, then nine points for number two, eight points for number three, and so on. The total points a record earned determined it's year-end rank. The complete chart life of each record is represented. The Cashbox year-end ranking is also listed, along with other honors as noted.

Top American hits on record

British number one hits not included above
Winter
 "Keep On Running" – The Spencer Davis Group
 "Michelle" – The Overlanders
 "The Sun Ain't Gonna Shine (Anymore)" – The Walker Brothers
Spring
 "Somebody Help Me" – The Spencer Davis Group
 "Pretty Flamingo" – Manfred Mann
Summer
 "Sunny Afternoon" – The Kinks
 "Get Away" – Georgie Fame and the Blue Flames
 "With a Girl Like You" – The Troggs
 "All or Nothing" – Small Faces
Autumn
 "Distant Drums" – Jim Reeves
 "Green, Green Grass of Home" – Tom Jones

Other significant recordings

(Not all of these were necessarily released as singles.)

Published popular music
 "Alfie" w. Hal David m. Burt Bacharach from the film Alfie
 "Big Spender" w. Dorothy Fields m. Cy Coleman from the musical Sweet Charity
 "If I Were a Carpenter" w.m. Tim Hardin
 "The Rhythm of Life" w. Dorothy Fields m. Cy Coleman from the musical Sweet Charity
 "Sunny" w.m. Bobby Hebb
 "Wedding Bell Blues" w.m. Laura Nyro

Other notable songs
 "Ces Gens-Là" by Jacques Brel
 "La maison où j'ai grandi" ("Il ragazzo della via Gluck") by Adriano Celentano, French lyrics by Eddy Marnay
 "Nessuno Mi Può Giudicare/Lei Mi Aspetta" by Gene Pitney
 "Parce Que Tu Crois" by Charles Aznavour
 "Les sucettes" by Serge Gainsbourg

Classical music

Premieres

Compositions
 Gilbert Amy
 Cycle, for percussion sextet
 Trajectoires, for violin and orchestra
 Malcolm Arnold – Fantasy for solo flute
 Jean Barraqué – Chant après chant for soprano, piano, and six percussionists
 George Crumb – Eleven Echoes of Autumn (Echoes I) for violin, alto flute, clarinet, and piano
 Mario Davidovsky
 Junctures for flute, clarinet, and violin
 Synchronisms No. 4 for chorus and tape
 Erhard Karkoschka – Quattrologe, for string quartet
 John Serry Sr. – Concerto for Free Bass Accordion
 Roger Sessions – Symphony No. 6
 Dmitri Shostakovich – String Quartet No.11 in F minor, Op. 122
 Karlheinz Stockhausen –
 Adieu (für Wolfgang Sebastian Meyer), for wind quintet, Nr. 21
 Solo, for a melody instrument with feedback, Nr. 19
 Telemusik, electronic and concrete music, Nr. 20
 Robert Ward – Fiesta Processional

Opera
 Samuel Barber – Antony and Cleopatra
 Vittorio Giannini – Servant of Two Masters
 Jorge Peña Hen – La Cenicienta (Cinderella)
 Mark Kopytman – Casa Mare
 Peter Westergaard – Mr and Mrs Discobbolos
 Grace Williams – The Parlour

Jazz

Musical theater
 The Apple Tree – Broadway production opened at the Shubert Theatre and ran for 463 performances
 Breakfast at Tiffany's – Broadway-bound production (closed in previews)
 Cabaret (John Kander & Fred Ebb) – Broadway production opened at the Broadhurst Theatre and ran for 1,165 performances
 Funny Girl (Jule Styne and Bob Merrill) – London production
 I Do! I Do! – Broadway production opened at the 46th Street Theatre and ran for 560 performances
 It's a Bird...It's a Plane...It's Superman – Broadway production opened at the Alvin Theatre and ran for 129 performances
 The Mad Show – Off-Broadway production
 Mame – Broadway production opened at the Winter Garden Theatre and ran for 1,508 performances
 The Penny Friend – Off-Broadway production
 Sweet Charity (Music: Cy Coleman Lyrics: Dorothy Fields Book: Neil Simon) – Broadway production opened at the Palace Theatre and ran for 608 performances
 Wait a Minim! – Off-Broadway production

Musical films
 A Funny Thing Happened on the Way to the Forum
 Alibaba Aur 40 Chor, with music by Usha Khanna
 Bhimanjaneya Yuddham, with music by T. V. Raju
 Dancing the Sirtaki
 Dus Lakh
 Fiebre de juventud, starring Enrique Guzmán
 The Glass Bottom Boat starring Doris Day
 Hold On! starring Herman's Hermits
 Mera Saaya
 Nichigeki [Kayama Yuzo sho] yori–utau wakadaisho, starring Yūzō Kayama (concert film)
 Paradise, Hawaiian Style starring Elvis Presley
 Stop the World – I Want to Get Off
 The Big T.N.T. Show (concert film)

Musical television
 Brigadoon starring Robert Goulet and Sally Ann Howes

Births
 January 1 – Crazy Legs, Puerto Rican breakdancer (Rock Steady Crew)
 January 3 – Martin Galway, Northern Irish composer
 January 4 – Deana Carter, American country singer-songwriter, musician
 January 5 – Kate Schellenbach, American punk rock drummer (Luscious Jackson) and television producer
 January 6
 Sharon Cuneta, Filipina singer and TV personality
 A. R. Rahman, Indian composer, singer-songwriter, music producer, musician and philanthropist
 January 7 – Ehab Tawfik, Egyptian singer
 January 8 – Andrew Wood, singer (Mother Love Bone) (died 1990)
 January 14 – Marko Hietala, Finnish rock bassist (Nightwish)
 January 16 – Maxine Jones, American singer-songwriter and actress (En Vogue)
 January 17 – Shabba Ranks, dancehall artist
 January 20
 Tracii Guns, American guitarist
 Wes King, guitarist, singer
 January 21 – Wendy James, British rock singer (Transvision Vamp)
 January 25 – Samvel Yervinyan, Armenian violinist and composer
 January 30 – Hans Tutschku, German composer
 February 2 – Robert DeLeo (Stone Temple Pilots and Army of Anyone
 February 6 – Rick Astley, English singer-songwriter and radio personality
 February 9 – Rachel Bolan (Skid Row)
 February 11 – Tenor Saw, dancehall artist (died 1988)
 February 12 – Paul Crook, American guitarist (Anthrax)
 February 26 – Najwa Karam, Lebanese singer
 March 2 – Howard Bernstein, producer
 March 3
 Tone-Loc, rapper
 Mikal Blue, English music producer, songwriter, engineer and mixer, collabotor with Colbie Caillat
 March 4 – Grand Puba, American rapper (Brand Nubian)
 March 7 – Atsushi Sakurai, Japanese singer (Buck-Tick)
 March 10 – Edie Brickell, singer-songwriter
 March 12 – David Daniels, countertenor
 March 18 – Jerry Cantrell, Alice in Chains
 March 19 – Anja Rupel, singer
 March 21 – DJ Premier, record producer
 March 25 – Jeff Healey, Canadian guitarist (died 2008)
 April 2 – Garnett Silk, reggae singer (died 1994)
 April 11 – Lisa Stansfield, singer
 April 13 – Marc Ford (The Black Crowes)
 April 15 – Samantha Fox, British model and singer
 April 18 – Ana Voog, singer-songwriter
 April 21 – Michael Franti, American singer-songwriter and guitarist (The Beatnigs and The Disposable Heroes of Hiphoprisy)
 April 28 – Too Short, rapper
 May 1 – Anne Fletcher, American film director and choreographer
 May 8
 Blag Dahlia, American musician, producer and author
 Marta Sánchez, vocalist and entertainer
 May 10 – Wade Domínguez, American actor, model, singer and dancer (died 1998)
 May 11 – Christoph Schneider, German rock musician (Rammstein)
 May 12 – Bebel Gilberto, Brazilian popular singer
 May 13
 Alison Goldfrapp, English musician and record producer (Goldfrapp)
 Darius Rucker (Hootie & the Blowfish)
 Jeffrey Scott Holland, American artist and musician
 May 14 – Raphael Saadiq, singer-songwriter and record producer
 May 16 – Janet Jackson, African American singer-songwriter, dancer and actress
 May 19 – Neil Campbell, Scottish-born experimental musician
 May 22 – Johnny Gill, African American R&B singer-songwriter (New Edition)
 May 24 – Ella Guru, American painter and musician
 May 26 – Tommy Stewart (Godsmack)
 May 27 – Titi DJ, Indonesian pop singer
 May 28 – Theo Bleckmann, German vocalist and composer
 May 30 – Stephen Malkmus, American rock singer (Pavement)
 June 4 – Cecilia Bartoli, operatic mezzo-soprano
 June 6
Aadesh Shrivastava, composer and singer
Sean Yseult, American bass player (White Zombie and The Cramps)
 June 8
 Jens Kidman, Swedish musician
 Doris Pearson, R&B singer (Five Star)
 June 14 – Matt Freeman, bassist (Rancid)
 June 15 – Roberto Carnevale, Italian musician
 June 22 – Schooly D, American rapper
 June 24 – Hope Sandoval, American singer-songwriter (Mazzy Star and Hope Sandoval & the Warm Inventions)
 June 26 – Jürgen Reil, German drummer (Kreator)
 June 28 – Bobby Bare, Jr., American musician
 July 7 – Gundula Krause, German violinist
 July 9 – Gayle and Gillian Blakeney, Australian actresses and singers
 July 11 – Melanie Appleby, Mel and Kim (died 1990)
 July 12
Taiji, Japanese bass player and songwriter (Loudness and X Japan) (died 2011)
Misato Watanabe, Japanese singer
 July 13 – Gerald Levert, American singer (died 2006)
 July 14 – Tanya Donelly, American musician
 July 15 – Jason Bonham, drummer
 July 17
Lou Barlow, American guitarist and songwriter (Deep Wound, Dinosaur Jr., Sebadoh and The Folk Implosion)
Keith Elam, rapper & producer
 July 20 – Stone Gossard, American singer-songwriter and guitarist (Pearl Jam, Mother Love Bone, Brad, Temple of the Dog and Green River)
 July 29 – Martina McBride, American country singer
 August 11 – Juan Maria Solare, composer
August 16 – Emanuel Kiriakou, American songwriter, producer, record executive, music publisher and multi-instrumentalist,
 August 19
 Lilian Garcia, American singer and wrestling ring announcer
 Lee Ann Womack, singer
 August 20 – Dimebag Darrell, American rock guitarist (Pantera) (died 2004)
 August 22 – GZA/Genius, rapper
 August 25
 Derek Sherinian, American keyboardist
 Terminator X, DJ
 August 26 – Shirley Manson, Scottish rock musician (Garbage)
 September 2 – Yu Hayami, Japanese pop idol singer
 September 4 – Yanka Dyagileva, Russian singer
 September 5 – Terry Ellis (En Vogue)
 September 8 – Carola Häggkvist, Swedish pop singer
 September 10 – Robin Goodridge (Bush)
 September 12 – Ben Folds, singer-songwriter
 September 17 – Doug E. Fresh, American rapper, record producer and beatboxer
 September 20 – Nuno Bettencourt (Extreme)
 September 22 – Moustafa Amar, Egyptian pop star
 October 2 – Mousse T., DJ
 October 12 – Brian Kennedy, Irish musician and author
 October 15 – Eric Benét, gospel singer
 October 18 – Tim Cross, Sponge
 October 19 – Sinitta, singer and actress
 October 23 – Skúli Sverrisson, Icelandic composer and bassist
 October 31
 Annabella Lwin, vocalist (Bow Wow Wow)
 Ad-Rock, Beastie Boys
 November 6 – Paul Gilbert, American musician
 November 11 – Peaches, born Merrill Nisker, Canadian electronic musician and performance artist
 November 14 – Charles Hazlewood, English orchestral conductor
 November 16 – Christian Lorenz, keyboard player
 November 17
 Jeff Buckley, singer-songwriter (died 1997)
 Soup the Chemist, born Christopher Jose Cooper, pioneering American Christian hip hop rapper
 Kate Ceberano, Australian singer and actress
 November 20 – Kevin Gilbert (musician), American singer, composer and instrumentalist
 November 23 – Charlie Grover (Sponge)
 November 24 – Joseph "DJ Run" Simmons, Run D.M.C.
 November 25 – Stacy Lattisaw, singer
 December 4 – Masta Ace, rapper
 December 8 – Sinéad O'Connor, Irish singer-songwriter, priest, activist
 December 9 – Michael Foster, drummer for rock band FireHouse
 December 12
 Pops Fernandez, Filipina singer and TV personality
 Greg Long, contemporary Christian musician
 December 20 – Chris Robinson, vocalist (The Black Crowes)
 December 29 – Dexter Holland of The Offspring

Deaths
 January 29 – Pierre Mercure, Canadian bassoon player and composer, 39
 February 9 – Sophie Tucker, blues singer, 82
 February 10 – Billy Rose, impresario, 66
 February 13 – Marguerite Long, pianist, 87
 February 23 – Billy Kyle, jazz pianist, 51
 March – Mohamed El Qasabgi, composer
 March 29 – Jazz Gillum, harmonica player, 61 (shot)
 March 30 – Jelly d'Arányi, violinist, 72
 April 3 – Russel Crouse, librettist, 73
 April 19 – Javier Solís, Mexican ranchera and bolero singer, 34 (complications following gall bladder surgery)
 April 30 – Richard Fariña, folk singer, 29 (motorcycle accident)
 May 13 – Henrik Adam Due, violinist, music teacher, 75
 June 1 – Papa Jack Laine, bandleader, 92
 June 12 – Hermann Scherchen, conductor, 74
 June 17 – Johnny St. Cyr, jazz musician, 76
 July 3 – Deems Taylor, composer and music critic, 80
 July 18 – Bobby Fuller, singer and guitarist, 23 (possible suicide or murder)
 July 31 – Bud Powell, jazz pianist, 41
 August 2 – Boyd Raeburn, jazz musician, 52 (heart attack)
 August 2 or 3 – Tristan Klingsor, poet, painter and musician, 91
 August 4 – Helen Tamiris, dancer and choreographer, 61
 August 15 – Jan Kiepura, Polish tenor and actor, 64
 September 17 – Fritz Wunderlich, tenor, 35 (fell downstairs)
 September 26 – Helen Kane, singer, 62
 September 28 – Lucius "Lucky" Millinder, US bandleader, 56 (liver disease)
 October 3 – Dave Lambert, jazz musician, 49 (road accident)
 October 7
 Johnny Kidd, British singer, 30 (car accident)
 Smiley Lewis, R&B musician, 53 (stomach cancer)
 October 12 – Arthur Lourié, composer, 74
 October 26 – Alma Cogan, English singer, 34 (stomach cancer)
 October 17 – Karel Hruška, operatic tenor, 75
 October 29 – Wellman Braud, jazz musician, 75
 November 1
 Alexis Roland-Manuel, composer, 75
 Dick Roberts, guitar and banjo player, 69
 November 2 – Mississippi John Hurt, blues musician, 73 or 74
 November 6 – Washboard Sam, blues musician, 56 (heart disease)
 November 12 – Quincy Porter, composer, 69
 November 28 – Vittorio Giannini, opera composer, 63
 December 1 – Carter Stanley, bluegrass musician, half of The Stanley Brothers, 41 (alcohol-related)
 December 3 – Kui Lee, singer-songwriter, 34 (gland cancer)
 December 9 – Yuri Shaporin, composer, 79
 December 12 – Nellie Briercliffe, singer and actress with the D'Oyly Carte company, 77
 December 14 – Shailendra, lyricist, 43
 December 24 – Gaspar Cassadó, cellist and composer, 69

Awards

Grammy Awards
 Grammy Awards of 1966

Eurovision Song Contest
 Eurovision Song Contest 1966

Leeds International Piano Competition
 Rafael Orozco

Van Cliburn International Piano Competition
 Radu Lupu

See also
 Hot 100 No. 1 Hits of 1966

References

Further reading
 Whitburn, Joel. Billboard Top 10 Singles Charts 1955–2000 (2001)

 
20th century in music
Music by year